Leersia is a genus of plants in the grass family which includes species known generally as cutgrasses.

The genus is widespread across many countries on all the inhabited continents.

It was named for the German botanist Johann Daniel Leers (1727-1774).

 Species
 Leersia angustifolia Prodoehl - Sudan
 Leersia denudata Launert - from Kenya to Cape Province
 Leersia drepanothrix Stapf  - from Guinea to Uganda
 Leersia friesii Melderis  - from Uganda to Botswana
 Leersia hexandra Sw. - Africa, Eurasia, Australian, North + South America, various islands
 Leersia japonica (Honda) Honda  - China, Japan, Korea
 Leersia lenticularis Michx. - central + eastern USA
 Leersia ligularis Trin. - Latin America + West Indies from Coahuila to Paraguay
 Leersia monandra Sw. - Texas, Florida, Mexico, West Indies
 Leersia nematostachya Launert - Cameroon, Angola, Zambia
 Leersia oncothrix C.E.Hubb. - Zambia
 Leersia oryzoides (L.) Sw. - Eurasia (from Azores to Primorye), North America (Canada, USA, northeastern Mexico)
 Leersia perrieri (A.Camus) Launert - Madagascar
 Leersia sayanuka Ohwi - China, Japan, Korea, Vietnam
 Leersia stipitata Bor - Thailand
 Leersia tisserantii (A.Chev.) Launert - from Guinea to Namibia
 Leersia triandra C.E.Hubb. - Sierra Leone, Liberia, Cameroon
 Leersia virginica Willd. - eastern Canada, eastern + central USA

 formerly included
see Arthraxon Digitaria Hygroryza Maltebrunia Megastachya 
 Leersia aristata - Hygroryza aristata 
 Leersia digitaria - Digitaria ciliaris 
 Leersia disticha - Megastachya mucronata
 Leersia hispida - Arthraxon hispidus
 Leersia latifolia - Maltebrunia leersioides

References

External links

 
 Leersia Fact Sheet
 Grass Manual Treatment

Oryzoideae
Poaceae genera
Taxa named by Carl Linnaeus